ZAZ or Zaporizhzhia Automobile Building Plant (Zaporiz'kyi avtomobilebudivnyi zavod or Zaporiz'kyi avtozavod)  is the main automobile manufacturer of Ukraine, based in the south-eastern city of Zaporizhzhia. It also produces buses and trucks and is known for its former parent company's name, AvtoZAZ.

History 
The date of foundation of the plant is considered to be 1863. In 1908, the company was founded, which later became the Melitopol Motor Plant (MeMZ). In 1923, the former Abram Koop plant was renamed the Communar. In 1960, the Melitopol Motor Plant began to supply its engines to the Zaporizhia Automobile Plant. Since 1975, MeMZ has become a part of the production association "AvtoZAZ". Today it is one of the structural elements of PJSC "ZAZ". In 1961 the plant was renamed "Zaporizhia Automobile Plant". The plant was engaged in the production of a single car - ZAZ-965, which went down in history as a "humpbacked Zaporozhets".

JV "AvtoZAZ-DEU" (since January 2003 - CJSC "ZAZ") in the form of a closed joint stock company was established on April 15, 1998, on the production base of JSC "Avtozaz". The authorized capital was formed at the expense of the founders' contributions: from OJSC Avtozaz - property in the amount equivalent to $150; from Daewoo Motors - $150 million. In addition to the main enterprise in Zaporizhia, the joint venture also included the Melitopol Motor Plant (Fracturing Plant AvtoZAZ-Motor), the Black Sea Plant of Automobile Units (Fracturing Plant ChZAA), and the Pologi Plant Iskra (Fracturing Plant Iskra) as self-supporting enterprises.

Following the bankruptcy of Daewoo Motors in 2001, UkrAvto bought AvtoZAZ in 2002. All production facilities of AvtoZAZ (primarily MeMZ and the Black Sea Motor Plant) were transformed into ZAZ. The company has even adopted a new logo. Daewoo's stake (50%) in the joint venture was bought by the Swiss company Hirsch & CIE in 2003.

PJSC "ZAZ" is now the only company in Ukraine that has a full cycle of passenger car production, which includes stamping, welding, painting, body equipment and car assembly. The plant has created and is constantly improving a qualitatively new modern high-tech production that meets the requirements of the international standard ISO 9001 version 2000.

The first three symbols of the VIN-code of Zaporizhia-made cars are Y6D.

From A. J. Koop to Kommunar
The company that became ZAZ developed out of four businesses founded by German entrepreneur Abram J. Koop to manufacture agricultural machinery. The factory had been built for local Mennonite industrialist Abram J. Koop in 1863. It produced iron parts for the windmills, reapers, threshers and plows. They were nationalized and restarted as the state-operated Kommunar factory which continued to produce twenty-four types of machines;. its first combine harvesters appeared in 1929, with 129,724 built by 1952 (not counting the war years). In 1930 Kommunar started to produce the first Soviet harvester Kommunar which was based on the American Holt Caterpillar horse-drawn harvester. The production of the harvester allowed the Soviet Union to cease import of harvesters from abroad.

From harvesters to cars

Design of a car accessible to the public, and one in part taking the place of the soon to be discontinued Moskvitch 401, began in 1956. Following the growing trend of small cars (then accounting for between 25% and 40% of all European car sales), the minister in charge of Minavtroprom (the Soviet automotive ministry) selected the new Fiat 600 as the model to follow. The first prototype, the MZMA 444, appeared in October 1957. It was powered by a flat twin-cylinder MD-65 engine provided by the Irbitskyi Motorcycle Plant, which was "totally unsuited": it produced only  and lasted only  between major overhauls. As a result, a search for another engine was begun, and the success of the VW Type 1's boxer led to a preference for an air-cooled engine, which NAMI (the National Automobile Institute) had on the drawing board. Minavtroprom, however, preferred a    V4 engine, the NAMI-G, which had the additional advantage of being developed for the LuAZ-967.

The new car was approved for production 28 November 1958, the name changing to ZAZ (Zaporizhzhia Automobile Building Plant) to reflect the new profile. The Zaporizhzhia factory was supplemented with the Mikoyan Diesel-Building Factory in Melitopol, which was part of the Soyuzdiesel combinat.

The first car, dubbed the ZAZ-965 Zaporozhets, was delivered 12 June 1959, was approved 25 July 1960, and entered production 25 October.

Following on the success of the 965, plant manager Yuri Sorochkin planned a forward control microbus on the 965's platform (akin to the VW Type 2 being built on a modified Type 1 pan), with a  payload, as the ZAZ 970. Sorochkin hoped to capture the market for compact utility vehicles, which were in perennially short supply in the Soviet Union. The project was prototyped by a team under Yuri Danilov, which pioneered use of -thick steel in the Soviet Union. The steel was provided by Zaporizkyi Metallurgical Plant. The engine and transmission were straight out of a 965, which caused liftover problems, because the V4 was mounted under the rear floor. None was built.

Further growth in Ukraine 
In 1975 the factory was consolidated in the AvtoZAZ holding, which was transformed into joint-stock company in 1990s. In 1986 ZAZ together with Comau installed a new production complex. The Illichivsk factory of automobile parts (IZAA) in one of the biggest freight sea ports on Black Sea in Illichivsk became part of the AutoZAZ holding. Newer front wheel drive cars are based on model 1102 Tavria (1989–2007) and are powered by a water cooled, front mounted MeMZ engine and fall into micro-class. On June 1, 1994, the factory ceased production of its 968M model.

When AvtoZAZ-Daewoo joint venture with Daewoo Motors was formed in 1998, ZAZ was assigned to the new company as a 50% share on behalf of AvtoZAZ. Daewoo Motors made large investments and established the production of its own models, while keeping and modernizing the native ZAZ brand. CKD kits of Daewoo Lanos, Daewoo Nubira and Daewoo Leganza started assembling the same year in Chornomorsk; at the same time, CKD assembly of a number of older VAZ models started.

Following the bankruptcy of Daewoo Motors in 2001, UkrAVTO corporation bought out AvtoZAZ holding in 2002. All of the AvtoZAZ manufacturing facilities (most notably, MeMZ and Illichivsk assembling plant) were reincorporated into ZAZ. The company even adopted a new logo. The Daewoo part in the joint venture was bought out by Swiss venture Hirsch & CIE in 2003.

End of 2004 saw the beginning of full-scale production of completely domestic ZAZ Lanos (T150), now that CKD kits of Lanos were no longer supplied. In 2006, ZAZ reached an agreement with the Chinese manufacturer Chery Automobile to assemble passenger cars from kits and from 2011 started full-scale production of the Chery A13 under its own badge as ZAZ Forza. The same year production of the Chevrolet Aveo (T250) was moved from the FSO car factory to ZAZ.

By Decree of the President of Ukraine, CJSC "ZAZ" employees were rewarded with State awards of Ukraine in 2009.

In the first half of 2012 ZAZ manufactured 20,060 vehicles, a 30% decline from the same period in 2011. In 2012 Zaporizhzhia Automobile Building Plant started serial full-scale production of new car model, the ZAZ Vida.

The era of "Zaporozhets" 

The history of passenger car production in Zaporizhia, which is identified with the history of the Ukrainian automobile industry in general, dates back to 1960, when the first Ukrainian microcar - ZAZ-965 "Zaporozhets" came off the assembly line of the Kommunar plant (currently PJSC ZAZ).

Production of serial machines began on October 1, 1960, and by the end of the year was released about one and a half thousand "Zaporozhtsiv". ZAZ-965 "Zaporozhets" quickly became popular. It cost relatively little and was economical. Operating fuel consumption was 7.3 liters per 100 km against 10 liters in "Moskvich-402" or "Moskvich-407". The full-fledged 4-seater was compact and maneuverable: its length was 3.33 m, and the radius of rotation behind the track of the outer wheel - 5 m. Independent suspension of all wheels, smooth, without a tunnel for the "cardan", bottom, 20-centimeter ground clearance the rear axle provided good passability. There were, of course, shortcomings. For example, the noise, which often annoyed the rear passengers. The doors opened in the old-fashioned way, against the move, and could, if accidentally opened on the move, become a sail that could easily take the car off the road. Unsuccessful, from the point of view of fire safety, was the location of the gas tank in front of the body.

Many motorists were not satisfied with the insufficient engine power, and therefore - the weak dynamics of the "Zaporozhets". Therefore, in October 1962 the production of the modernized ZAZ-965A began. Engine displacement increased from 746 to 887 cm³, respectively, power increased from 22 to 27 hp. The maximum speed has also increased - from 80 to 90 km / h. This machine was produced until 1969. When the 130th anniversary of the plant was celebrated in September 1993, the festive motorcade was opened by one of the first "Zaporozhians", decorated with a banner with the number 332 106. This is the number of cars produced during the years of production - from 1960 to 1969. In 1961, ZAZ designers began to develop the ZAZ-966 car with a new body. However, its production was delayed due to the allied leadership, perhaps for economic reasons - to put on the assembly line a new model just a year after the release of the previous one was considered inappropriate. Therefore, ZAZ-966 was released only six years later. Its engine was also located at the rear. Initially, it was a 30-horsepower MeMZ-966A, which was installed on the latest modifications of the "humpback" predecessor. Then came the 40-horsepower MeMZ-966V, which allowed the car to accelerate to 120 km / h on a straight road. However, in practice, not everyone could develop such a speed, and fines for speeding "Zaporozhets" were so rare that in itself such an event was regarded as a topic worthy of a joke.

Since 1969, on the basis of the model 966 began to produce ZAZ-968 with a new engine and some minor changes. Since 1975 in the same body - ZAZ-968A. It featured a new brake system, improved front seats and an ignition lock with anti-theft device. Before the ZAZ-968A in 1972 there was a slightly modernized model ZAZ-968 - it did not have a decorative panel on the front of the body, there was a new unit. A more serious reworking awaited the model in 1979–1980.

ZAZ-968M became not only the last domestic car with a rear engine, but also the most durable, because it was produced until 1994. But he received a new line of engines: more powerful MeMZ-968 GE (45 hp) and MeMZ-968 BE (50 hp).

In total (from 1960 to 1994) 3,422,444 Zaporozhets cars in Zaporizhia and air-cooled engines in Melitopol were manufactured.

The era of «Tavria» 
The history of "Tavria" is interesting and diverse, because the current car was preceded by many different prototypes, some of which have remained forever in the form of models, dusted in the design offices of ZAZ, and others were embodied in metal and once passed running tests .

The first conceptual variant that left the plant on its own was the front-wheel drive ZAZ-1102 "Tavria" of the 1970 model, developed by a group of Kommunar specialists under the leadership of chief designer Steshenko. However, the tests revealed many design flaws that determined the museum's future of this car.

In 1973, two more experimental models were prepared with a 3-door hatchback and a 4-door sedan, which also failed to reach the level of a production car. The next stages in the evolution of the ZAZ-1102 Tavria were the 1974 front-wheel drive prototype with an elegant sedan body and the all-wheel drive version of the 1976 model with a completely modern appearance at the time.

The designers of the Kommunar plant needed a lot of time to prepare and launch into serial production in 1988 the final version of the ZAZ-1102 "Tavria". In 1991, three years after the start of production, the car was restyled, during which the shape of the front wings and interior elements changed. To reduce the cost of the car, attempts were made to switch from expensive front Czech optics to domestic. The cessation of production threatened "Tavria" in the mid-1990s, because buyers did not have money for a new car. And the quality of ZAZ products was severely lame: it concerned both the production itself and the components. But despite the difficult times in 1995, the plant prepared for production a new model based on "Tavria" - a five-door station wagon ZAZ-1105 "Dana", which was produced until 1997.

Since 1994, a new circuit for switching on the electric fan has been introduced and the design of the half-axles has been changed. But the introduction of local Ukrainian components has negatively affected the overall quality of the models, especially after 1992.

After the founding of JV AvtoZAZ-Daewoo in 1998, some modernization of the structure and saturation of the market with imported (Korean) components, there was hope for the rehabilitation of the quality of the car. In 1998, the so-called "transitional samples" were still in production, the complete set of which may not correspond to the declared one.

In the fall of 1995, the ZAZ-1103 Slavuta, a five-door liftback based on the Tavria base, was presented.  In 1999, its serial production began.

"AvtoZAZ-Daewoo" 
In 1998, a Ukrainian-Korean joint venture with foreign investment was registered in the form of the closed joint-stock company AvtoZAZ-Daewoo. Production of a qualitatively new ZAZ-110206 "Tavria-Nova" car has been introduced. Production preparation works have been completed and large-scale assembly of European-level cars Daewoo Lanos, Daewoo Nubira, Daewoo Leganza has been started at the Black Sea Automobile Assembly Plant.

Thanks to the financial support of a foreign partner, new technologies, unique quality control systems, engineering developments, which were introduced together with investments, as well as the consistent assistance of the state, a new historical stage has begun for Zaporizhzhya plant.  In 1999, UkrAvto Corporation was delegated the functions of managing the state-owned stake in the plant. In 2002, UkrAvto Corporation became the owner of the state block of shares of Zaporizhzhya Automobile Plant (more than 82% of shares of OJSC AvtoZAZ, which in turn owns 50% of shares of CJSC ZAZ) and received the right to manage the enterprise and, in particular, its production programs. In January 2003, the company was renamed the Zaporizhia Automobile Plant.

During 1998–2003, the company underwent profound structural changes according to new, world standards. organized quality control of products that meet international standards; production of Daewoo cars began at the car assembly plant in the Black Sea; after modernization at the main plant in Zaporozhye, the production of a qualitatively new Tavria was resumed; administrative and personnel policy changed. This period was also marked by significant changes in the strategy opened up new prospects and opportunities for cooperation with the greats of the global automotive business - DaimlerChrysler, General Motors, Opel, Renault and others, which allowed to implement investment projects to organize full-scale production of leading global brands.

PJSC "ZAZ" 
In 2003, the plant changed its form of ownership and became a Closed Joint-Stock Company with Foreign Investment "Zaporizhzhya Automobile Plant".

Also in 2003, a general distribution agreement was concluded between UkrAvto Corporation (represented by one of its divisions - UkrAvtoZAZ-Service), Zaporizhia Automobile Plant and the German company Adam Opel GmbH (European representative office of GMC). Opel acted as a production partner of ZAZ and UkrAvto, providing investments for the development of large- and small-scale production of cars of its model range.

In the same year, the Swiss financial and investment company Hirsch & Cie acquired a 50% stake in ZAZ owned by Daewoo Motors.

In 2004, serial production of the Opel Astra Classic began.

In 2005, full-scale production of the Daewoo Lanos began at the Zaporizhia Automobile Plant.

UkrAvto Corporation became the main shareholder of the flagship of the Polish automotive industry - the FSO plant. The Chevrolet Lanos car, manufactured by the Zaporizhia Automobile Plant, was exported to Russia.

In 2005, ZAZ designers developed the ZAZ Lanos Pick-up.

In 2005, the plant produced 148,163 cars, in 2006 - 193,113.

In 2006, the production of I-VAN buses was started on the basis of the platform of the well-known Indian company TATA.

In 2010, the production of ZAZ A10 buses with a load-bearing body and units of leading European companies began.

September 10, 2010 - ZAZ Lanos Electro van and ZAZ-A10C31 and ZAZ-A10L50 buses were presented at the 2010 Auto Show in Kyiv.

In 2011, production of a new model - ZAZ Forza - began.

In 2011, PJSC "ZAZ" produced 60,862 cars, which is 33.9% more than in 2010 (45,465), with more than 50% of the cars produced for export.

ZAZ and its reputation 

ZAZ's products were never held in high esteem by Soviet citizens. In fact, ZAZ's original mission was to create a "people's car", almost like Volkswagen's initial mission. In May 2009, ZAZ won the international tender for the production of vehicles for veterans and disabled people of Azerbaijan.

Models

Cars
Zaporozhets
965 Zaporozhets (1960–1962) city car
965P Zaporozhets
965A Zaporozhets (1962–1969) city car
965AE Jalta
966 Zaporozhets (1967–1971) subcompact
968 Zaporozhets (1972–1978) subcompact
968A Zaporozhets (1974–1980) subcompact
968M Zaporozhets (1980–1994) subcompact
968MP Zaporozhets
Tavria
1102 Tavria (1989–1997) hatchback
1105 Dana
1102 Tavria Nova (1998–2007) hatchback
11055 Tavria Pick-up
1103 Slavuta (1998–2011) liftback

Buses
Minibuses
A07 I-VAN (2005–2020) minibus
A08 (2020–present) minibus
Midibuses
A10 (2008–present) midibus
A10C City
A10L Lux

Concepts and prototypes
970 (1961)
971 (1962)
967 (1965)
1902 (1977)
2301 Snaga (1995)

Complete knock down assembly 
Rebadged production performed at the  Zaporizhzhia Automobile Building Plant (ZAZ):
Daewoo Lanos T100 as ZAZ L1300 (2000–2001)
Daewoo Lanos T100 as ZAZ Sens (2002–2007)
Daewoo Lanos T100 as ZAZ Lanos (2005–2007)
Daewoo Lanos T150 as ZAZ Sens (2007–2017)
Daewoo Lanos T150 as ZAZ Lanos (2007–2017)
Chery A13 as ZAZ Forza (2010–2014)
Chevrolet Aveo as ZAZ Vida (2012–2014)

Performed at the Illichivsk Automobile Parts Plant (IZAA):

Daewoo Lanos (1998–2005) (model T100)
Daewoo Nubira (1998–2001)
Daewoo Leganza (1998–2001)
Daewoo Sens (2002–2005)
Chevrolet Lacetti (2003–unknown) (model J200)
Chevrolet Aveo (2004–unknown) (model T200)
Chevrolet Captiva (2005–unknown)
Chevrolet Epica (2005–unknown)
Chevrolet Evanda (2005–unknown)
Daewoo Tacuma (2005–unknown)
Chevrolet Aveo (2006–unknown) (model T250)
Kia Cerato (unknown years)
Kia Magentis (unknown years)
Kia Mohave (unknown years)
Kia Picanto (unknown years)
Kia Rio (unknown years)
Kia Sorento (unknown years)

Former production performed at the Zaporizhzhia Automobile Building Plant (ZAZ):
Mercedes-Benz E-Class (2002–2006)
Mercedes-Benz M-Class (2002–2006)
Dacia Solenza (2003)
Opel Astra (2003–unknown)
Opel Vectra (2003–unknown)
Opel Corsa (2003–unknown)
Opel Combo (2003–unknown)
Chery Amulet (2005-unknown)
Lada 21093 (2005–unknown)
Lada 21099 (2005–unknown)
Kia Cee'd (2009–2010)
Kia Sportage (2009–present)

Current production performed at the Melitopol Motor Plant (MeMZ):
TATA LPT-613 (2014–present)

Production capacity 

 1998 — 24,000
 1999 — 6,000▼
 2000 — 11,700▲
 2001 — 14,800▲
 2002 — 23,800▲
 2003 — 69,600▲
 2004 — 126,000▲
 2005 — 148,163▲
 2006 — 193,113▲
 2007 — 282,300▲
 2008 — 257,600▼
 2009 — 46,180▼
 2010 — 45,465▼
 2011 — 60,862▲
 2012 — 42,700▼
 2013 — 50,400▲
 2014 — 13,100▼
 2015 — 3,937▼
 2016 — 526▼
 2017 — 1,674▲
 2018 — 131▼
 2019 ---
 2020 --- 885▲

Assembly in other countries
 Poland (Damis) - ZAZ-1102 Tavria
 Syria - ZAZ-1103 Slavuta
 Egypt (General Motors Egypt) - Chevrolet Lanos
 Kazakhstan (AgromashHolding) - ZAZ Chance

Gallery

Currently produced cars and buses under ZAZ brand

Older models

References

External links 

 
 Auto ZAZ specifications

 
Companies based in Zaporizhzhia
Car manufacturers of Ukraine
Motor vehicle assembly plants in Ukraine
Ukrainian brands